Kur is the name of the ancient Sumerian Underworld.

Kur, KUR or kur may also refer to:

Places
 Kur, East Azerbaijan, a village in Iran
 Kur, Iran, a village in Hormozgan Province
 Kur, Kaleybar, a village in East Azerbaijan Province, Iran
 Kur, Rajasthan, a village in Jodhpur District, India
 Kur, Tulkarm, a Palestinian village
 Kur Island, an island of Indonesia
 Kuril Islands, name derived from "kur"

Other uses 
 Kur (cuneiform)
 Kur (surname)
Kur, a hypothetical reconstruction of the name of the name of Yujiulü Mugulü, 4th century leader of the Rouran Khaganate
 Kur, species in Gor novels by John Norman
 Musical kur, a form of dressage 
 Kur language
 Kurdish language, ISO 639 code

See also
 Kür, village and municipality in Azerbaijan
 Kur River (disambiguation), several rivers
 Cur, a word for a mongrel dog